Mujhe Khuda Pe Yaqeen Hai (I have faith in God) is a Pakistani drama serial, starring Ahsan Khan, Ayesha Khan, Momal Sheikh and Mikaal Zulfiqar airing on Hum TV released on 13 August 2013. The show is directed by Barkat Siddiqui and  story written by Seema Munaf and Atiya Dawood.

Description 
The story revolves around four characters; Arham whose unknown transgression has cut him off from the rest of the family, his older brother Shaiq who doesn't seem to be interested in his newlywed wife, Narmeen who is also a very grey-shaded character and holds mysteries herself, Areeba is the most genuine and helps bring Arham back out of his miseries.

Synopsis 
The story of "Mujhe Khuda Pey Yakeen hai" revolves around Arham, Areeba, Narmeen and Shahiq. The selfish, greedy and cunning Narmeen gets engaged to Arham, conning him into believing she is in love with him until she comes across Shahiq, Arham’s brother who has completed his MBA from America and has now returned to Pakistan. Instantly she begins to regret her move and makes a false accusation against Arham so that her engagement can be broken off, after which she successfully marries Shahiq. Just when Arham, who has become a culprit in his family’s eyes begins to get fed-up with his circumstances, his sister’s friend, Areeba, tries to become a part of his life, igniting Narmeen’s jealousy.

Accolades

Cast
 Ahsan Khan as Arham
 Ayesha Khan as Narmeen
 Mikaal Zulfiqar as Shaiq
 Momal Sheikh as Areeba
 Talat Hussain as Irshad
 Ayesha Khan as Shazia
 Samra Arsalan as Sara
 Shakeel as Shakeel
 Sajida Syed as Saman
 Raju Jamil as Saif
 Azra Mohyeddin as Ameena

References 

Hum TV original programming
Urdu-language television shows
Pakistani drama television series
2013 Pakistani television series debuts
Romantic fantasy television series